The 2022 Pennsylvania gubernatorial election was held on November 8, 2022, to elect the governor of Pennsylvania and lieutenant governor of Pennsylvania. Democratic state attorney general Josh Shapiro defeated Republican state senator Doug Mastriano in a landslide victory to succeed term-limited incumbent Democratic governor Tom Wolf. Primaries were held on May 17, 2022. Shapiro won the Democratic nomination after running unopposed and Mastriano won the Republican nomination with 44% of the vote. Mastriano's nomination drew attention due to his far-right political views. 

Shapiro defeated Mastriano by almost 15 points, a margin consistent with most polls. Shapiro scored the largest margin for a non-incumbent candidate for governor since 1946, and his victory marked the first time since 1844 that the Democratic Party won three consecutive gubernatorial elections in Pennsylvania. Shapiro also made history by earning the most votes of any gubernatorial candidate in the state's history, garnering just over three million votes. Austin Davis was elected Lieutenant Governor, and became the second African-American elected to statewide office in the state's history, following Timothy DeFoor in 2020.

Shapiro's large margin of victory has been widely credited with helping down-ballot Democrats in concurrent elections.

Democratic primary

Governor

Campaign 
Pennsylvania Attorney General Josh Shapiro ran unopposed and was described as the Democratic Party's presumptive nominee by The Philadelphia Inquirer and the Pennsylvania Capital-Star early in the campaign, with the Capital-Star reporting that efforts to recruit a primary challenger to the left of Shapiro (who is considered a progressive by the paper) had failed.

Candidates

Nominee
 Josh Shapiro, Pennsylvania Attorney General (2017–2023), former member of the Montgomery County Board of Commissioners (2012–2017),  former state representative for HD-153 (2005–2012)

Failed to qualify for ballot access
 Tega Swann, Christian minister

Declined
Brendan Boyle, U.S. representative for Pennsylvania's 2nd congressional district (2019present) and former U.S. representative for Pennsylvania's 13th congressional district (20152019) (running for re-election)
 John Fetterman, Lieutenant Governor of Pennsylvania (2019–2023), candidate for the U.S. Senate in 2016 (ran for the U.S. Senate)
Jim Kenney, mayor of Philadelphia (2016present)
Sara Innamorato,  state representative for the 21st legislative district (2019present)
 Joe Torsella, former Pennsylvania state treasurer (2017–2021)

Endorsements

Results

Lieutenant governor

Candidates

Nominee 
 Austin Davis, state representative from the 35th district (2018–present)

Eliminated in primary 
 Brian Sims, state representative from the 182nd district (2012–present)
 Ray Sosa, candidate for lieutenant governor of Pennsylvania in 2018

Declined
Elizabeth Fiedler, state representative for the 184th legislative district (2019present)
David Highfield, LGBT activist and reporter for KDKA–TV
Steve Irwin, Banking Commissioner of Pennsylvania (2006–2014) (ran unsuccessfully for Congress)
 Michelle Kenney, activist for Black Lives Matter and mother of Antwon Rose
Malcolm Kenyatta, state representative for the 181st legislative district (2019present) (ran unsuccessfully for the U.S. Senate, endorsed Shapiro)
Joe Torsella, former Pennsylvania state treasurer (2017–2021)

Withdrew 
 Patty Kim, state representative for the 103rd legislative district (2013–present), Harrisburg City Council member (2006–2012) (running for re-election)
 Mark Pinsley, Lehigh County controller (2019–present) (running for State Senate)

Endorsements

Results

Republican primary
In the Republican primary, leading candidates included former Congressman Lou Barletta, Montgomery County Commissioner Joe Gale, political strategist Charlie Gerow, former U.S. Attorney William McSwain, State Senator Doug Mastriano and former Delaware County Councilmember Dave White.

Several key issues, such as school choice, natural gas exploration in PA, and tax reform, were early themes in the Pennsylvania GOP debates before the primary election, while voting laws in the Commonwealth were a later topic of debate.

Due to his support for overturning the results of the 2020 presidential election and his role in the January 6 U.S. Capitol attack, many Republicans expressed concern about Mastriano's ability to win the general election. As a result, the party encouraged other candidates to drop out to allow for an alternative to Mastriano to gain traction.

On May 12, president pro tempore of the Pennsylvania Senate Jake Corman dropped out and endorsed Barletta. On May 14, former President Donald Trump endorsed Mastriano. On May 12, The Philadelphia Inquirer reported that former U.S. Representative Melissa Hart would also drop out and endorse Barletta. Mastriano won the primary anyway with almost 44% of the vote, defeating his nearest competitor, Barletta, by over 23 points.

The New York Times reported in mid-June that Mastriano had been aided in the primary by the Pennsylvania Democratic Party and Shapiro's campaign with an ad equating him to Trump. Shapiro defended the move, saying the ad demonstrated the contrast between him and Mastriano as part of the general election campaign. The Times saw it as part of a nationwide strategy to gain easier opponents in November.

Governor

Candidates

Nominee 
Doug Mastriano, State senator from SD-33 (2019–present) and candidate for PA-13 in 2018

Eliminated in primary 
 Lou Barletta, U.S. Representative from PA-11 (2011–2019), Republican nominee for U.S. Senate in 2018
 Joe Gale, Member of the Montgomery County Board of Commissioners (2016–present), candidate for lieutenant governor of Pennsylvania in 2018
 Charlie Gerow, Vice-chair of the American Conservative Union
 William McSwain, U.S. attorney for the Eastern District of Pennsylvania (2018–2021)
 Dave White, Member of the Delaware County Council (2012–2017)
 Nche Zama, cardiothoracic surgeon

Withdrew 
, CEO of the Chester County Chamber of Business & Industry (2014–present), Chief of staff to Lieutenant Governor Jim Cawley (2011–2014) (running for Congress)
Jake Corman, state senator from District 34 (1999–2022), President pro tempore of the Pennsylvania Senate (2020–2022) (endorsed Barletta)
Melissa Hart, U.S. Representative from Pennsylvania's 4th congressional district (2001–2007), state senator from District 40 (1991–2001) (endorsed Barletta)
, State Senator from District 13 (2017–present)
Jason Monn, former mayor of Corry (2015–2016) (ran for State Representative)
Jason Richey, attorney at K&L Gates (endorsed McSwain)
Mike Turzai, Speaker of the Pennsylvania House of Representatives (2015–2020), state representative from HD-28 (2001–2020), candidate for Governor of Pennsylvania in 2018
Shawn Berger, restaurant owner
John Ventre, Westmoreland County Republican Committeeman

Declined
Ryan Aument, state senator for the 36th senatorial district (2015–present)
 Jeff Bartos, businessman and nominee for lieutenant governor of Pennsylvania in 2018 (ran unsuccessfully for U.S. Senate)
 Jim Cawley, former lieutenant governor of Pennsylvania (2011–2015) (endorsed Barletta)
 Laureen Cummings, former Lackawanna County commissioner and Republican nominee for Pennsylvania's 17th congressional district in 2012
 Brian Fitzpatrick, U.S. Representative from Pennsylvania's 1st congressional district (2019–present)
 Daniel J. Hilferty, former CEO of Independence Blue Cross
 Mike Kelly, U.S. Representative from Pennsylvania's 16th congressional district (2011–present) (running for re-election)
Dan Laughlin, state senator for the 49th senatorial district (2017–present)
 Paul Mango, businessman and candidate for governor of Pennsylvania in 2018
Dan Meuser, U.S. Representative from Pennsylvania's 9th congressional district (2019–present) (running for re-election, endorsed Barletta)
Jason Ortitay, state representative for the 46th legislative district (2015–present) (running for re-election)
 Pat Toomey, U.S. Senator

Debates and forums

Endorsements

Polling
Graphical summary

Results

Lieutenant governor

Candidates

Nominee 
 Carrie DelRosso, state representative for HD-33 (2021–2022), Member of Oakmont Borough Council (2018–2021)

Eliminated in primary 
 Jerry Carnicella, candidate for state representative for HD-72 in 2018 and 2020 and for state senator in SD-35 in 2016
 Jeff Coleman, State representative for HD-60 (2001–2004), founder of Churchill Strategies
 Teddy Daniels, candidate for Pennsylvania's 8th congressional district in 2020
 Russ Diamond, State representative for HD-102 (2015–present)
 Chris Frye, Mayor of New Castle, Pennsylvania (2019–present)
 Angela Grant, School director for the Jersey Shore Area School District (2019–present)
 Rick Saccone, State representative for HD-39 (2011–2019), nominee for Pennsylvania's 18th congressional district in 2018
 Clarice Schillinger, Executive director of Back to School PA PAC

Declined 
 Brandon Flood, former secretary of the Pennsylvania Board of Pardons (2019–2021) (Endorsed Coleman)

Endorsements

Results

Libertarian nomination 
The Libertarian Party nominees qualified for the general election ballot on August 1.

Governor

Nominee 
 Matt Hackenburg, aerospace computer engineer

Eliminated in board vote 
 Nicole Shultz, auditor of Windsor Township, York County (2022–present) and treasurer of the Libertarian Party of Pennsylvania (2021–2022) (originally ran for Lieutenant Governor; running as the Keystone nominee for Lieutenant Governor)

Withdrew 
 Joe Soloski, public accountant and nominee for state representative from the 81st district in 2018 and state treasurer in 2020 (running as the Keystone nominee)

Lieutenant governor

Nominee 
 Tim McMaster, IT analyst, farmer, and nominee for state senator from the 48th district in 2021

Withdrew 
 Nicole Shultz, auditor of Windsor Township, York County (2022–present) and treasurer of the Libertarian Party of Pennsylvania (2021–2022) (ran for Governor)

Green convention 
The Green Party nominees qualified for the general election ballot on August 1.

Governor

Nominee 
 Christina DiGiulio, environmental activist and former analytical chemist

Withdrew 
 Christina Olson, small business owner and co-chair of the Green Party of Pennsylvania

Lieutenant governor

Nominee 
Michael Bagdes-Canning, mayor of Cherry Valley (2022–present), former member of the Cherry Valley Borough Council (1989–2022), and nominee for state representative from the 64th district in 2016 and 2020

Independent and other parties

Governor

Nominee 
Joe Soloski (Keystone nominee), public accountant and Libertarian nominee for state representative from the 81st district in 2018 and state treasurer in 2020 (originally ran as a Libertarian)

Withdrew 
Eddie Wenrich (Independent), store manager (ran for state representative)

Lieutenant governor

Nominee 
 Nicole Shultz (Keystone nominee), auditor of Windsor Township, York County (2022–present) and treasurer of the Keystone Party of Pennsylvania (2022–present) (originally ran as a Libertarian for lieutenant governor and later governor)

General election

Campaign 
Attorney General Josh Shapiro ran a progressive campaign emphasized on protecting abortion rights, voter rights, and raising the state's minimum wage to $15 an hour. On criminal justice issues, Shapiro promised to sign a bill abolishing the death penalty (after previously supporting it), but has also faced criticism from some left-wing voters for adopting a "tough on crime" image. In addition, he has openly feuded with Philadelphia District Attorney Larry Krasner.

State Senator Doug Mastriano positioned himself as a staunch ally of former President Donald Trump, promoting conspiracy theories about the 2020 election, defense of Confederate monuments, arming school teachers with firearms, and to disobey COVID-19 safety protocols. Mastriano also drew accusations of antisemitism and for using anti-semitic dogwhistles against Shapiro (who is Jewish). One of Mastriano's most vocal supporters was Andrew Torba, the CEO of far-right social media website Gab, which was the same website where the perpetrator of the Tree of Life Synagogue shooting posted before committing the massacre. Torba donated $500 to the Mastriano campaign, and Mastriano himself told the Gab founder in an interview, "Thank god for what you've done."

No debate was held during the general election, as Shapiro and Mastriano were unable to come to an agreement on how to debate. In addition, Mastriano did not release his first general election ads until October, while the more well-funded Shapiro had already spent $18.6 million in television broadcasting by that time. These factors, combined with Mastriano's refusal to talk to major media outlets and decision to ban journalists from campaign rallies, severely limited his voter outreach.

Predictions

Endorsements

Polling
Aggregate polls

Graphical summary

Generic Democrat vs. generic Republican

Results

Analysis 
Josh Shapiro defeated Doug Mastriano by 14.8%. While this marked a 2.73% Republican swing from 2018, it was still 13.18% larger than Joe Biden's win in the presidential race in Pennsylvania two years earlier, and 9.86% larger than Shapiro's reelection for Attorney General that same year. All counties in the Keystone State voted the exact same way they did in 2018, with Shapiro doing best in heavily populated Southeastern Pennsylvania, which is made up of Philadelphia and its suburbs, Berks County (Reading), the Lehigh Valley (Allentown, Bethlehem, and Easton), the Wyoming Valley (Scranton, Wilkes-Barre, and Hazleton), the Susquehanna Valley (Harrisburg and Carlisle), Erie County in the northwest corner, and finally, Greater Pittsburgh in the southwest.

Doug Mastriano, meanwhile, piled up large margins in Pennsylvania's rural counties, but also won some populous places like Butler, Washington, and Westmoreland counties near Pittsburgh. He also carried Lancaster, including the counties contained (either fully or partially) within his State Senate district, namely Adams, Franklin and York. Except for Adams and Franklin counties, Lancaster and York were once again carried by single digits by the Republican gubernatorial candidate just like 2018, as Mastriano's extremist views likely turned off moderate Independents and Republicans in these areas.

Southeastern Pennsylvania, a strong Democratic area during elections, shifted more Democratic. This region, with strongly Democratic Philadelphia, anchored by its suburbs, has become a Democratic stronghold in elections, winning all Delaware Valley counties. Southeastern Pennsylvania piled up large margins in its suburbs. Its electorate is highly educated, affluent, and diverse. In addition to the region's strong Democratic tilt, abortion rights were a significant campaign issue among voters. According to CNN polling data, 62% of Pennsylvania voters believed abortion should be legal, and those voters broke for Shapiro by a landslide margin of 81%–18%. College-educated voters, who made up 41% of the electorate, also voted heavily for Shapiro by a 64%–35% margin.

Voter demographics 
Voter demographic data for 2022 was collected by CNN. The voter survey is based on exit polls completed by 2,657 voters in person as well as by phone.

See also
 2022 Pennsylvania elections

Notes

Partisan clients

References

External links 

Official campaign websites for gubernatorial candidates
 Christina DiGiulio (G) for Governor
 Matt Hackenburg (L) for Governor
 Doug Mastriano (R) for Governor
 Josh Shapiro (D) for Governor
 Joe Soloski (K) for Governor

Official campaign websites for lieutenant gubernatorial candidates
 Michael Bagdes-Canning (G) for Lieutenant Governor
 Carrie DelRosso (R) for Lieutenant Governor
 Tim McMaster (L) for Lieutenant Governor
 Nicole Shultz (K) for Lieutenant Governor

2022 Pennsylvania elections
2022
Pennsylvania
Josh Shapiro